Néstor Senra Pérez (born 4 January 2002) is a Spanish-born Equatoguinean footballer who plays as a right back for Tercera División RFEF club Sevilla C and the Equatorial Guinea national team.

Early life
Senra was born and raised in Spain to an Equatoguinean-born Spaniard father and a Spanish mother. His paternal great-grandfather and his paternal grandfather had emigrated from Spain to Equatorial Guinea to work. His paternal grandmother was born in Equatorial Guinea, but was Spaniard as well. His father was granted dual citizenship and could also give the Equatoguinean citizenship up to five descendants, choosing him as one of them.

Club career
Senra is a youth academy player of Sevilla.

International career
In August 2021, Senra received maiden call-up to Equatorial Guinea national team for FIFA World Cup qualification matches against Tunisia and Mauritania.

Career statistics

International

References

External links

 

2002 births
Living people
Citizens of Equatorial Guinea through descent
Equatoguinean footballers
Association football fullbacks
Equatorial Guinea international footballers
Equatoguinean sportspeople of Spanish descent
People of Andalusian descent
People of Galician descent
Footballers from Seville
Spanish footballers
Sevilla FC C players
Tercera División players
Spanish sportspeople of Equatoguinean descent
Spanish people of Galician descent